Georgia Totto O'Keeffe (November 15, 1887 – March 6, 1986) was an American modernist artist. She was known for her paintings of enlarged flowers, New York skyscrapers, and New Mexico landscapes. O'Keeffe has been called the "Mother of American modernism".

In 1905, O'Keeffe began art training at the School of the Art Institute of Chicago and then the Art Students League of New York. In 1908, unable to fund further education, she worked for two years as a commercial illustrator and then taught in Virginia, Texas, and South Carolina between 1911 and 1918. She studied art in the summers between 1912 and 1914 and was introduced to the principles and philosophies of Arthur Wesley Dow, who created works of art based upon personal style, design, and interpretation of subjects, rather than trying to copy or represent them. This caused a major change in the way she felt about and approached art, as seen in the beginning stages of her watercolors from her studies at the University of Virginia and more dramatically in the charcoal drawings that she produced in 1915 that led to total abstraction. Alfred Stieglitz, an art dealer and photographer, held an exhibit of her works in 1917. Over the next couple of years, she taught and continued her studies at the Teachers College, Columbia University.

She moved to New York in 1918 at Stieglitz's request and began working seriously as an artist. They developed a professional and personal relationship that led to their marriage in 1924. O'Keeffe created many forms of abstract art, including close-ups of flowers, such as the Red Canna paintings, that many found to represent vulvas, though O'Keeffe consistently denied that intention. The imputation of the depiction of women's sexuality was also fueled by explicit and sensuous photographs of O'Keeffe that Stieglitz had taken and exhibited.

O'Keeffe and Stieglitz lived together in New York until 1929, when O'Keeffe began spending part of the year in the Southwest, which served as inspiration for her paintings of New Mexico landscapes and images of animal skulls, such as Cow's Skull: Red, White, and Blue and Ram's Head White Hollyhock and Little Hills. After Stieglitz's death, she lived in New Mexico at Georgia O'Keeffe Home and Studio in Abiquiú until the last years of her life, when she lived in Santa Fe. In 2014, O'Keeffe's 1932 painting Jimson Weed/White Flower No. 1 sold for $44,405,000, more than three times the previous world auction record for any female artist. After her death, the Georgia O'Keeffe Museum was established in Santa Fe.

Early life
Georgia O'Keeffe was born on November 15, 1887, in a farmhouse in the town of Sun Prairie, Wisconsin. Her parents, Francis Calyxtus O'Keeffe and Ida (Totto) O'Keeffe, were dairy farmers. Her father was of Irish descent. Her maternal grandfather, George Victor Totto, for whom O'Keeffe was named, was a Hungarian count who came to the United States in 1848.

O'Keeffe was the second of seven children. She attended Town Hall School in Sun Prairie. By age 10, she had decided to become an artist, and with her sisters, Ida and Anita, she received art instruction from local watercolorist Sara Mann. O'Keeffe attended high school at Sacred Heart Academy in Madison, Wisconsin, as a boarder between 1901 and 1902. In late 1902, the O'Keeffes moved from Wisconsin to the close-knit neighborhood of Peacock Hill in Williamsburg, Virginia, where O'Keeffe's father started a business making rusticated cast concrete block in anticipation of a demand for the block in the Peninsula building trade, but the demand never materialized. O'Keeffe stayed in Wisconsin with her aunt attending Madison Central High School until joining her family in Virginia in 1903. She completed high school as a boarder at Chatham Episcopal Institute in Virginia (now Chatham Hall), graduating in 1905. At Chatham, she was a member of Kappa Delta sorority.

O'Keeffe taught and headed the art department at West Texas State Normal College, watching over her youngest sibling, Claudia, at her mother's request. In 1917, she visited her brother, Alexis, at a military camp in Texas before he shipped out for Europe during World War I. While there, she created the painting The Flag, which expressed her anxiety and depression about the war.

Career

Education and early career

From 1905 to 1906, O'Keeffe was enrolled at the School of the Art Institute of Chicago, where she studied with John Vanderpoel and ranked at the top of her class. As a result of contracting typhoid fever, she had to take a year off from her education. In 1907, she attended the Art Students League in New York City, where she studied under William Merritt Chase, Kenyon Cox, and F. Luis Mora. In 1908, she won the League's William Merritt Chase still-life prize for her oil painting Dead Rabbit with Copper Pot. Her prize was a scholarship to attend the League's outdoor summer school in Lake George, New York. While in the New York City, O'Keeffe visited galleries, such as 291, co-owned by her future husband, photographer Alfred Stieglitz. The gallery promoted the work of avant-garde artists and photographers from the United States and Europe.

In 1908, O'Keeffe discovered that she would not be able to finance her studies. Her father had gone bankrupt and her mother was seriously ill with tuberculosis. She was not interested in a career as a painter based on the mimetic tradition that had formed the basis of her art training. She took a job in Chicago as a commercial artist and worked there until 1910, when she returned to Virginia to recuperate from the measles and later moved with her family to Charlottesville, Virginia. She did not paint for four years and said that the smell of turpentine made her ill. She began teaching art in 1911. One of her positions was at her former school, Chatham Episcopal Institute, in Virginia.

She took a summer art class in 1912 at the University of Virginia from Alon Bement, who was a Columbia University Teachers College faculty member. Under Bement, she learned of the innovative ideas of Arthur Wesley Dow, Bement's colleague. Dow's approach was influenced by principles of design and composition in Japanese art. She began to experiment with abstract compositions and develop a personal style that veered away from realism. From 1912 to 1914, she taught art in the public schools in Amarillo in the Texas Panhandle, and was a teaching assistant to Bement during the summers. She took classes at the University of Virginia for two more summers. She also took a class in the spring of 1914 at Teachers College of Columbia University with Dow, who further influenced her thinking about the process of making art. Her studies at the University of Virginia, based upon Dow's principles, were pivotal in O'Keeffe's development as an artist. Through her exploration and growth as an artist, she helped to establish the American modernism movement.

She taught at Columbia College in Columbia, South Carolina in late 1915, where she completed a series of highly innovative charcoal abstractions based on her personal sensations. In early 1916, O'Keeffe was in New York at Teachers College, Columbia University. She mailed the charcoal drawings to a friend and former classmate at Teachers College, Anita Pollitzer, who took them to Alfred Stieglitz at his 291 gallery early in 1916. Stieglitz found them to be the "purest, finest, sincerest things that had entered 291 in a long while", and said that he would like to show them. In April that year, Stieglitz exhibited ten of her drawings at 291.

After further course work at Columbia in early 1916 and summer teaching for Bement, she became the chair of the art department at West Texas State Normal College, in Canyon, Texas, beginning in the fall of 1916. She began a series of watercolor paintings based upon the scenery and expansive views during her walks, including vibrant paintings of Palo Duro Canyon.  O'Keeffe, who enjoyed sunrises and sunsets, developed a fondness for intense and nocturnal colors. Building upon a practice she began in South Carolina, O'Keeffe painted to express her most private sensations and feelings. Rather than sketching out a design before painting, she freely created designs. O'Keeffe continued to experiment until she believed she truly captured her feelings in the watercolor, Light Coming on the Plains No. I (1917). She "captured a monumental landscape in this simple configuration, fusing blue and green pigments in almost indistinct tonal graduations that simulate the pulsating effect of light on the horizon of the Texas Panhandle," according to author Sharyn Rohlfsen Udall. After her relationship with Alfred Stieglitz started, her watercolor paintings ended quickly. Stieglitz heavily encouraged her to quit because the use of watercolor was associated with amateur women artists.

New York
Stieglitz, 24 years older than O'Keeffe, provided financial support and arranged for a residence and place for her to paint in New York in 1918. They developed a close personal relationship while he promoted her work.  She came to know the many early American modernists who were part of Stieglitz's circle of artists, including painters Charles Demuth, Arthur Dove, Marsden Hartley, John Marin, and photographers Paul Strand and Edward Steichen. Strand's photography, as well as that of Stieglitz and his many photographer friends, inspired O'Keeffe's work. Also around this time, O'Keeffe became sick during the 1918 flu pandemic.

O'Keeffe began creating simplified images of natural things, such as leaves, flowers, and rocks. Inspired by Precisionism, The Green Apple, completed in 1922, depicts her notion of simple, meaningful life. O'Keeffe said that year, "it is only by selection, by elimination, and by emphasis that we get at the real meaning of things." Blue and Green Music expresses O'Keeffe's feelings about music through visual art, using bold and subtle colors.

Also in 1922, journalist Paul Rosenfeld commented "[the] Essence of very womanhood permeates her pictures", citing her use of color and shapes as metaphors for the female body. This same article also describes her paintings in a sexual manner.

O'Keeffe, most famous for her depiction of flowers, made about 200 flower paintings, which by the mid-1920s were large-scale depictions of flowers, as if seen through a magnifying lens, such as Oriental Poppies and several Red Canna paintings. She painted her first large-scale flower painting, Petunia, No. 2, in 1924 and it was first exhibited in 1925. Making magnified depictions of objects created a sense of awe and emotional intensity. On November 20, 2014, O'Keeffe's Jimson Weed/White Flower No 1 (1932) sold for $44,405,000 in 2014 at auction to Walmart heiress Alice Walton, more than three times the previous world auction record for any female artist.

Art historian Linda Nochlin interpreted Black Iris III (1926) as a morphological metaphor for a vulva, but O'Keeffe rejected that interpretation, claiming they were just pictures of flowers.

After having moved into a 30th floor apartment in the Shelton Hotel in 1925, O'Keeffe began a series of paintings of the city skyscrapers and skyline. One of her most notable works, which demonstrates her skill at depicting the buildings in the Precisionist style, is the Radiator BuildingNight, New York. Other examples are New York Street with Moon (1925), The Shelton with Sunspots, N.Y. (1926), and City Night (1926). She made a cityscape, East River from the Thirtieth Story of the Shelton Hotel in 1928, a painting of her view of the East River and smoke-emitting factories in Queens. The next year she made her final New York City skyline and skyscraper paintings and traveled to New Mexico, which became a source of inspiration for her work.

In 1924, Stieglitz arranged a simultaneous exhibit of O'Keeffe's works of art and his photographs at Anderson Galleries and arranged for other major exhibits. The Brooklyn Museum held a retrospective of her work in 1927. In 1928, Stieglitz announced that six of her calla lily paintings sold to an anonymous buyer in France for US$25,000, but there is no evidence that this transaction occurred the way Stieglitz reported. As a result of the press attention, O'Keeffe's paintings sold at a higher price from that point onward. By the late 1920s she was noted for her work depicting American subjects, particularly for the paintings of New York city skyscrapers and close-up paintings of flowers.

Taos
O'Keeffe traveled to New Mexico by 1929 with her friend Rebecca Strand and stayed in Taos with Mabel Dodge Luhan, who provided the women with studios. From her room she had a clear view of the Taos Mountains as well as the morada (meetinghouse) of the Hermanos de la Fraternidad Piadosa de Nuestro Padre Jesús Nazareno aka the Penitentes. O'Keeffe went on many pack trips, exploring the rugged mountains and deserts of the region that summer and later visited the nearby D. H. Lawrence Ranch, where she completed her now famous oil painting, The Lawrence Tree, currently owned by the Wadsworth Athenaeum in Hartford, Connecticut. O'Keeffe visited and painted the nearby historical San Francisco de Asis Mission Church at Ranchos de Taos. She made several paintings of the church, as had many artists, and her painting of a fragment of it silhouetted against the sky captured it from a unique perspective.

New Mexico and New York

O'Keeffe then spent part of nearly every year working in New Mexico. She collected rocks and bones from the desert floor and made them and the distinctive architectural and landscape forms of the area subjects in her work. Known as a loner, O'Keeffe often explored the land she loved in her Ford Model A, which she purchased and learned to drive in 1929. She often talked about her fondness for Ghost Ranch and Northern New Mexico, as in 1943, when she explained, "Such a beautiful, untouched lonely feeling place, such a fine part of what I call the 'Faraway'. It is a place I have painted before ... even now I must do it again."

O'Keeffe did not work from late 1932 until about the mid-1930s as she endured various nervous breakdowns and was admitted to a psychiatric hospital. These nervous breakdowns were the result of O'Keeffe learning of her husband's affair. She was a popular artist, receiving commissions while her works were being exhibited in New York and other places. In 1936, she completed what would become one of her best-known paintings, Summer Days. It depicts a desert scene with a deer skull with vibrant wildflowers. Resembling Ram's Head with Hollyhock, it depicted the skull floating above the horizon.

In 1938, the advertising agency N. W. Ayer & Son approached O'Keeffe about creating two paintings for the Hawaiian Pineapple Company (now Dole Food Company) to use in advertising.  Other artists who produced paintings of Hawaii for the Hawaiian Pineapple Company's advertising include Lloyd Sexton, Jr., Millard Sheets, Yasuo Kuniyoshi, Isamu Noguchi, and Miguel Covarrubias. The offer came at a critical time in O'Keeffe's life: she was 51, and her career seemed to be stalling (critics were calling her focus on New Mexico limited, and branding her desert images "a kind of mass production"). She arrived in Honolulu February 8, 1939, aboard the SS Lurline and spent nine weeks in Oahu, Maui, Kauai, and the island of Hawaii. By far the most productive and vivid period was on Maui, where she was given complete freedom to explore and paint. She painted flowers, landscapes, and traditional Hawaiian fishhooks. Back in New York, O'Keeffe completed a series of 20 sensual, verdant paintings. However, she did not paint the requested pineapple until the Hawaiian Pineapple Company sent a plant to her New York studio.

During the 1940s, O'Keeffe had two one-woman retrospectives, the first at the Art Institute of Chicago (1943). Her second was in 1946, when she was the first woman artist to have a retrospective at the Museum of Modern Art (MoMA) in Manhattan.  Whitney Museum of American Art began an effort to create the first catalogue of her work in the mid-1940s.

O'Keeffe said that the Black Place resembled "a mile of elephants with gray hills and white sand at their feet." She made paintings of the "White Place", a white rock formation located near her Abiquiú house.

Abiquiú

In 1946, she began making the architectural forms of her Abiquiú house—patio wall and door—subjects in her work. Another distinctive painting was Ladder to the Moon, 1958. O'Keeffe produced a series of cloudscape art, such as Sky above the Clouds in the mid-1960s that were inspired by her views from airplane windows.

Worcester Art Museum held a retrospective of her work in 1960 and ten years later, the Whitney Museum of American Art mounted the Georgia O'Keeffe Retrospective Exhibition.

In 1972, O'Keeffe lost much of her eyesight due to macular degeneration, leaving her with only peripheral vision. She stopped oil painting without assistance in 1972. In the 1970s, she made a series of works in watercolor. Her autobiography, Georgia O'Keeffe, published in 1976 was a best seller.

Judy Chicago gave O'Keeffe a prominent place in her The Dinner Party (1979) in recognition of what many prominent feminist artists considered groundbreaking introduction of sensual and feminist imagery in her works of art. Although feminists celebrated O'Keeffe as the originator of "female iconography", O'Keeffe refused to join the feminist art movement or cooperate with any all-women projects. She disliked being called a "woman artist" and wanted to be considered an "artist."

She continued working in pencil and charcoal until 1984.

O'Keeffe's Flowers as Vulvas and Criticism 
O'Keeffe's lotus paintings may have deeper ties to vulvar imagery and symbolism. In Egyptian mythology, lotus flowers are a symbol of the womb, and in Indian mythology, they are direct symbols for vulvas.

Art dealer Samuel Kootz was one of O'Keeffe's critics who, although considering her to be "the only prominent woman artist" (in the words of Marilyn Hall Mitchell), considered sexual expression in her work (and other artists' work) artistically problematic. Kootz stated that "assertion of sex can only impede the talents of an artist, for it is an act of defiance, of grievance, in which the consciousness of these qualities retards the natural assertions of the painter".

O'Keeffe stood her ground against sexual interpretations of her work, and for fifty years maintained that there was no connection between vulvas and her artwork. Firing back against some of the criticism, O'Keeffe stated, “When people read erotic symbols into my paintings, they’re really talking about their own affairs.” She attributed other artists' attacks on her work to psychological projection. O'Keeffe was also seen as a revolutionary feminist; however, the artist rejected these notions, stating that "femaleness is irrelevant" and that “it has nothing to do with art making or accomplishment.”

Awards and honors
In 1938, O'Keeffe received an honorary degree of "Doctor of Fine Arts" from The College of William & Mary.  Later, O'Keeffe was elected to the American Academy of Arts and Letters and in 1966 was elected a Fellow of the American Academy of Arts and Sciences. Among her awards and honors, O'Keeffe received the M. Carey Thomas Award at Bryn Mawr College in 1971 and two years later received an honorary degree from Harvard University.

In 1977, President Gerald Ford presented O'Keeffe with the Presidential Medal of Freedom, the highest honor awarded to American civilians. In 1985, she was awarded the National Medal of Arts by President Ronald Reagan. In 1993, she was inducted into the National Women's Hall of Fame.

Personal life

Marriage 
In June 1918, O'Keeffe accepted Stieglitz's invitation to move to New York from Texas after he promised he would provide her with a quiet studio where she could paint. Within a month he took the first of many nude photographs of her at his family's apartment while his wife was away. His wife returned home once while their session was still in progress. She had suspected for a while that something was going on between the two, and told him to stop seeing O'Keeffe or get out. Stieglitz left home immediately and found a place in the city where he and O'Keeffe could live together. They slept separately for more than two weeks. By the end of the month they were in the same bed together, and by mid-August when they visited Oaklawn, the Stieglitz family summer estate in Lake George in upstate New York, "they were like two teenagers in love. Several times a day they would run up the stairs to their bedroom, so eager to make love that they would start taking their clothes off as they ran."

In February 1921, Stieglitz's photographs of O'Keeffe were included in a retrospective exhibition at the Anderson Galleries. Stieglitz started photographing O'Keeffe when she visited him in New York City to see her 1917 exhibition, and continued taking photographs, many of which were in the nude. It created a public sensation. When he retired from photography in 1937, he had made more than 350 portraits and more than 200 nude photos of her. In 1978, she wrote about how distant from them she had become, "When I look over the photographs Stieglitz took of me—some of them more than sixty years ago—I wonder who that person is. It is as if in my one life I have lived many lives."

Owing to the legal delays caused by Stieglitz's first wife and her family, it would take six years before he obtained a divorce. In 1924, O'Keeffe and Stieglitz got married. For the rest of their lives together, their relationship was, "a collusion....a system of deals and trade-offs, tacitly agreed to and carried out, for the most part, without the exchange of a word. Preferring avoidance to confrontation on most issues, O'Keeffe was the principal agent of collusion in their union," according to biographer Benita Eisler. They lived primarily in New York City, but spent their summers at his father's family estate, Oaklawn, in Lake George in upstate New York.

Mental health 
O'Keeffe's mental health was fragile. In 1928, Stieglitz began a long-term affair with Dorothy Norman, who was also married, and O'Keeffe lost a project to create a mural for Radio City Music Hall. She was hospitalized for depression. At the suggestion of Maria Chabot and Mabel Dodge Luhan, O'Keeffe began to spend the summers painting in New Mexico in 1929. She traveled by train with her friend the painter Rebecca Strand, Paul Strand's wife, to Taos, where they lived with their patron who provided them with studios.

Hospitalization 
In 1933, O'Keeffe was hospitalized for two months after suffering a nervous breakdown, largely due to Stieglitz's affair with Dorothy Norman. She did not paint again until January 1934. In 1933 and 1934, O'Keeffe recuperated in Bermuda and returned to New Mexico in 1934. In August 1934, she moved to Ghost Ranch, north of Abiquiú. In 1940, she moved into a house on the ranch property. The varicolored cliffs surrounding the ranch inspired some of her most famous landscapes. Among guests to visit her at the ranch over the years were Charles and Anne Lindbergh, singer-songwriter Joni Mitchell, poet Allen Ginsberg, and photographer Ansel Adams. She traveled and camped at "Black Place" often with her friend, Maria Chabot, and later with Eliot Porter.

Affairs 
During O'Keeffe's marriage to Stieglitz, both had several affairs, O'Keeffe's with women and men, for she was bisexual. Though the nature of their relationship is unconfirmed, there is substantial evidence that O'Keeffe had an affair with the famous painter Frida Kahlo sometime during her marriage to Diego Rivera. The two met in December 1931 in New York City at the opening of Rivera's solo exhibition at the MOMA. Lucienne Bloch, a friend and assistant of Frida and Diego, claimed that Rivera bragged later that his wife had been flirting with O'Keeffe. From here, a friendship and potential relationship began.

Soon after the women met, in 1932, Kahlo and her husband moved from NYC to Detroit. Here, Kahlo painted the famous Self Portrait on the Borderline Between Mexico and the United States. Many historians have noted the jack-in-the-pulpit flowers which lie on the Mexico side of the painting. These flowers, which are not native to Mexico, were the feature of a series of paintings by O'Keeffe just two years prior in which she painted the flowers at different periods of growth: one fully closed, one open, etc. This same series of growth is featured in Kahlo's painting.

In 1933, while O'Keeffe was hospitalized for a mental breakdown, Kahlo wrote to her, saying: "I thought of you a lot and never forget your wonderful hands and the color of your eyes." Kahlo also noted, "If you [are] still in the hospital when I come back I will bring you flowers, but it is so difficult to find the ones I would like for you. I would be so happy if you could write me even two words. I like you very much Georgia."

In another letter written to a friend and colleague a month later, Kahlo described this letter, saying: "O'Keeffe was in the hospital for three months, she went to Bermuda for a rest. She didn't made [sic] love to me that time, I think on account of her weakness. Too bad. Well that's all I can tell you until now." Though there is no record of O'Keeffe's response to Kahlo, this has been used as considerable evidence of a potential affair between the women.

There are a few other records of the women seeing each other a few other times. Both women visited each other's homes on a couple of occasions in the 1950s. Though records are not conclusive on whether their relationship was romantic or sexual or neither, and CNN goes so far as to describe their relationship as an explicitly "formative friendship", many sources claim that their relationship appeared somewhat one-sided; all the records and mementos that have been saved come from Kahlo.

New beginning 
In 1945, O'Keeffe bought a second house, an abandoned hacienda in Abiquiú, which she renovated into a home and studio. Shortly after O'Keeffe arrived for the summer in New Mexico in 1946, Stieglitz suffered a cerebral thrombosis (stroke). She immediately flew to New York to be with him. He died on July 13, 1946. She buried his ashes at Lake George. She spent the next three years mostly in New York settling his estate, and then moved permanently to New Mexico in 1949, spending time at both Ghost Ranch and the Abiquiú house that she made into her studio.

Todd Webb, a photographer she met in the 1940s, moved to New Mexico in 1961. He often made photographs of her, as did numerous other important American photographers, who consistently presented O'Keeffe as a "loner, a severe figure and self-made person." While O'Keeffe was known to have a "prickly personality," Webb's photographs portray her with a kind of "quietness and calm" suggesting a relaxed friendship, and revealing new contours of O'Keeffe's character.

Travels 
O'Keeffe enjoyed traveling to Europe, and around the world, beginning in the 1950s. Several times she took rafting trips down the Colorado River, including a trip down the Glen Canyon, Utah, area in 1961 with Webb and photographer Eliot Porter.

Career end and death 
In 1973, O'Keeffe hired John Bruce "Juan" Hamilton as a live-in assistant and then a caretaker. Hamilton was a potter, recently divorced and broke. This companion of her last years was 58 years her junior. Hamilton taught O'Keeffe to work with clay, encouraged her to resume painting despite her deteriorating eyesight, and helped her write her autobiography. He worked for her for 13 years. O'Keeffe became increasingly frail in her late 90s. She moved to Santa Fe in 1984, where she died on March 6, 1986, at the age of 98. Her body was cremated and her ashes were scattered, as she wished, on the land around Ghost Ranch.

Estate settlement
Following O'Keeffe's death, her family contested her will because codicils added to it in the 1980s had left most of her $65 million estate to Hamilton. The case was ultimately settled out of court in July 1987. The case became a famous precedent in estate planning.

Paintings

Legacy

O'Keeffe was a legend beginning in the 1920s, known as much for her independent spirit and female role model as for her dramatic and innovative works of art. Nancy and Jules Heller said, "The most remarkable thing about O'Keeffe was the audacity and uniqueness of her early work." At that time, even in Europe, there were few artists exploring abstraction. Even though her works may show elements of different modernist movements, such as Surrealism and Precisionism, her work is uniquely her own style. She received unprecedented acceptance as a woman artist from the fine art world due to her powerful graphic images and within a decade of moving to New York City, she was the highest-paid American woman artist. She was known for a distinctive style in all aspects of her life. O'Keeffe was also known for her relationship with Stieglitz, in which she provided some insight in her autobiography. The Georgia O'Keeffe Museum says that she was one of the first American artists to practice pure abstraction.

Mary Beth Edelson's Some Living American Women Artists / Last Supper (1972) appropriated Leonardo da Vinci’s The Last Supper, with the heads of notable women artists collaged over the heads of Christ and his apostles. John the Apostle's head was replaced with Nancy Graves, and Christ's with Georgia O'Keeffe. This image, addressing the role of religious and art historical iconography in the subordination of women, became "one of the most iconic images of the feminist art movement."

A substantial part of her estate's assets were transferred to the Georgia O'Keeffe Foundation, a nonprofit. The Georgia O'Keeffe Museum opened in Santa Fe in 1997. The assets included a large body of her work, photographs, archival materials, and her Abiquiú house, library, and property. The Georgia O'Keeffe Home and Studio in Abiquiú was designated a National Historic Landmark in 1998, and is now owned by the Georgia O'Keeffe Museum.

In 1996, the U.S. Postal Service issued a 32-cent stamp honoring O'Keeffe. In 2013, on the 100th anniversary of the Armory Show, the USPS issued a stamp featuring O'Keeffe's Black Mesa Landscape, New Mexico/Out Back of Marie's II, 1930 as part of their Modern Art in America series.

A fossilized species of archosaur was named Effigia okeeffeae ("O'Keeffe's Ghost") in January 2006, "in honor of Georgia O'Keeffe for her numerous paintings of the badlands at Ghost Ranch and her interest in the Coelophysis Quarry when it was discovered".

In November 2016, the Georgia O'Keeffe Museum recognized the importance of her time in Charlottesville by dedicating an exhibition, using watercolors that she had created over three summers. It was entitled, O'Keeffe at the University of Virginia, 1912–1914.

O'Keeffe holds the record ($44.4 million in 2014) for the highest price paid for a painting by a woman.

In 1991, PBS aired the American Playhouse production A Marriage: Georgia O'Keeffe and Alfred Stieglitz, starring Jane Alexander as O'Keeffe and Christopher Plummer as Alfred Stieglitz.

Lifetime Television produced a biopic of Georgia O'Keeffe starring Joan Allen as O'Keeffe, Jeremy Irons as Alfred Stieglitz, Henry Simmons as Jean Toomer, Ed Begley Jr. as Stieglitz's brother Lee, and Tyne Daly as Mabel Dodge Luhan. It premiered on September 19, 2009.

Publications

References

Further reading

External links

 Georgia O'Keeffe Museum Collections Online
 
 Alfred Stieglitz/Georgia O'Keeffe Archive at the Beinecke Rare Book and Manuscript Library at Yale University
 "O'Keeffe!", a solo actor play by Lucinda McDermott, Playscripts, Inc. 
 
 
 Georgia O'Keeffe, Archives of American Art, Smithsonian Institution

 
1887 births
1986 deaths
20th-century American painters
Abstract painters
American people of Hungarian descent
American people of Irish descent
American women painters
Painters from New York City
Artists from Santa Fe, New Mexico
Painters from Wisconsin
Art Students League of New York alumni
Teachers College, Columbia University alumni
Fellows of the American Academy of Arts and Sciences
Flower artists
Hawaii artists
Modern painters
American watercolorists
People from Amarillo, Texas
People from Sun Prairie, Wisconsin
People with mood disorders
Precisionism
Presidential Medal of Freedom recipients
School of the Art Institute of Chicago alumni
United States National Medal of Arts recipients
University of Virginia alumni
20th-century American women artists
Students of William Merritt Chase
Women watercolorists
Cowgirl Hall of Fame inductees
People from Abiquiú, New Mexico
West Texas A&M University faculty